Basirhat subdivision is an administrative subdivision of the North 24 Parganas district in the Indian state of West Bengal.

History
In 1757, the East India Company obtained the zamindari or land-holders rights of the 24 Parganas Zamindari from Mir Jafar, the new Nawab of Bengal.  Full proprietary status was handed over to Robert Clive in 1759 by a sanad or deed granting him the 24 Parganas as a jagir. After Clive's death in 1774, full proprietary rights of the 24 Parganas zamindari reverted to the East India Company. In 1814, the district consisted of two parts – the suburbs of Kolkata (referred to as Dihi Panchannagram) and the rest. In 1834, several parganas of Jessore and Nadia were added to the 24 Parganas. The district was divided into two divisions. The Alipore division comprised territories originally ceded to the company and the Barasat division comprised territories added from Jessore and Nadia. The two divisions were replaced by eight subdivisions in 1861 – Diamond Harbour, Baruipur, Alipore, Dum Dum, Barrackpore, Barasat, Basirhat and Satkhira. The Satkhira subdivision was transferred to the newly formed Khulna district in 1882, the Baruipur subdivision was abolished in 1883 and the Dum Dum and Barrackpore subdivisions in 1893. Barrackpore subdivision was reconstituted in 1904 with portions of Barasat and Alipore subdivisions.

Geography
Basirhat subdivision is part of the Ichhamati-Raimangal Plain, one of the three physiographic regions in the district located in the lower Ganges Delta. It contains soil of mature black or brownish loam to recent alluvium. The Ichhamati flows through the eastern part of the district.

Subdivisions
North 24 Parganas district is divided into the following administrative subdivisions:

Religion
Given below is an overview of the religion-wise break-up of the population across the subdivisions of North 24 Parganas district, as per 2011 census:

North 24 Parganas district with 24.22% Muslims (in 2001) has been identified as a minority concentrated district by the Ministry of Minority Affairs, Government of India. A baseline survey on religious minority population has been carried out under the aegis of Indian Council of Social Science Research and funded by the Ministry of Minority Affairs. For information on the survey see North 24 Parganas: minority concentrated district.

Population movement
North 24 Parganas district is densely populated, mainly because of the influx of refugees from East Pakistan (later Bangladesh). With a density of population of 2,182 per km2 in 1971, it was 3rd in terms of density per km2 in West Bengal after Kolkata and Howrah, and 20th in India. According to the District Human Development Report: North 24 Parganas, "High density is also explained partly by the rapid growth of urbanization in the district. In 1991, the percentage of urban population in the district has been 51.23."

As per the Refugee Relief and Rehabilitation Department of the Government of West Bengal, the census figures show the number of refugees from East Pakistan in 1971 was nearly 6 million (60 lakhs) and in 1981, the number was assessed at 8 million (80 lakhs). A district-wise break-up in 1971, shows the main thrust of the refugee influx was on 24-Parganas (22.3% of the total refugees), Nadia (20.3%), Bankura (19.1%) and Kolkata (12.9%).

The North 24 Paraganas district has a 352 km long international border with Bangladesh, out of which 160 km is land border and 192 km is riverine border. Only a small portion of the border has been fenced and it is popularly referred to as a porous border. There are reports of Bangladeshi infiltrators. The CD Block pages carry Decadal Population Growth information.

An estimate made in 2000 places the total number of illegal Bangladeshi immigrants in India at 1.5 crore, with around 3 lakh entering every year. The thumb rule for such illegal immigrants is that for each illegal person caught four get through. While many immigrants have settled in the border areas, some have moved on, even to far way places such as Mumbai and Delhi. The border is guarded by the Border Security Force. During the UPA government, Sriprakash Jaiswal, Union Minister of State for Home Affairs, had made a statement in Parliament on 14 July 2004, that there were 12 million illegal Bangladeshi infiltrators living in India, and West Bengal topped the list with 5.7 million Bangladeshis. More recently, Kiren Rijiju, Minister of State for Home Affairs in the NDA government has put the figure at around 20 million.

Administrative units
Basirhat subdivision has 11 police stations, 10 community development blocks, 10 panchayat samitis, 90 gram panchayats, 631 mouzas, 617 inhabited villages, 3 municipalities and 13 census towns. The municipalities are at Baduria, Taki and Basirhat. The census towns are: Itinda, Dandirhat, Uttar Bagundi, Dhanyakuria, Mathurapur, Raghunathpur, Dakshin Chatra, Deora, Sadigachhi, Hingalganj, Bankra, Minakhan, and Balihati. The subdivision has its headquarters at Basirhat.

Police stations
Police stations in Basirhat subdivision have the following features and jurisdiction:

Blocks
Community development blocks in Basirhat subdivision are:

Gram panchayats
The subdivision contains 90 gram panchayats under 10 community development blocks:

 Gram panchayats in Baduria CD Block are: Aturia, Chatra, Jadurhati Uttar, Sayestanagar–II, Bagjola, Jagannathpur, Raghunathpur, Jadurhati Dakshin, Bajitpur, Jasikati Atghara, Ramchandrapur Uday, Chandipur, Nayabastia Milani and Sayestanagar–I.
 Gram panchayats in Basirhat I CD Block are: Gachha Akharpur, Itinda Panitore, Pifa, Swetpur Sankchura Bagundi, Gotra, nimiya ke Daliya Kodalia and Sangrampur Shibati.
 Gram panchayats in Basirhat II CD block are: Begumpur Bibipur, Dhanyakuria, Kholapota, Ghorarash Kulingram, Rajendrapur, Chaita, Shrinagar Metia, Champapukur and Kachua.
 Gram panchayats in Haroa CD Block are: Bakjuri, Haroa, Shalipur, Gopalpur–I, Khasbalanda, Sonapukur Sankarpur, Gopalpur–II and Kulti.
 Gram panchayats in Hasnabad CD Block are: Amlani, Bhabanipur–I, Hasnabad, Patlikhanpur, Barunhat Rameswarpur, Bhabanipur–II, Makhalgachha, Bhebia and Murarisha.
 Gram panchayats in Hingalganj CD Block are: Bishpur, Hingalganj, Rupamari, Dulduli, Jogeshganj, Sahebkhali, Gobindakati, Kalitala and Sandelerbil.
 Gram panchayats in Minakhan CD block are: Atpukur, Chaital, Dhuturdaha, Minakhan, Bamanpukur, Champali, Kumarjole and Mohanpur.
 Gram panchayats in Sandeshkhali I CD Block are: Bayermari–I, Kalinagar, Sarberia Agarhati, Bayermari–II, Nazat–I, Sehera Radhanagar, Hatgachhi and Nazat–II.
 Gram panchayats in Sandeshkhali II CD Block are: Bermajur–I, Durgamandop, Khulna, Manipur, Bermajur–II, Jeliakhali, Korakati and Sandeshkhali.
 Gram panchayats in Swarupnagar CD Block are: Balti Nityanandakati, Bithari Hakimpur, Kaijuri, Swarupnagar Banglani, Charghat, Saguna, Bankra Gokulpur, Gobindapur, Sharapul Nirman and Tepur Mirzapur.

Municipal towns/ cities
An overview of the municipal towns and cities in Basirhat subdivision is given below.

Education
North 24 Parganas district had a literacy rate of 84.06% (for population of 7 years and above) as per the census of India 2011. Bangaon subdivision had a literacy rate of 80.57%, Barasat Sadar subdivision 84.90%, Barrackpur subdivision 89.09%, Bidhannagar subdivision 89.16% and Basirhat subdivision 75.67%.

Given in the table below (data in numbers) is a comprehensive picture of the education scenario in North 24 Parganas district for the year 2012-13:

Note: Primary schools include junior basic schools; middle schools, high schools and higher secondary schools include madrasahs; technical schools include junior technical schools, junior government polytechnics, industrial technical institutes, industrial training centres, nursing training institutes etc.; technical and professional colleges include engineering colleges, medical colleges, para-medical institutes, management colleges, teachers training and nursing training colleges, law colleges, art colleges, music colleges etc. Special and non-formal education centres include sishu siksha kendras, madhyamik siksha kendras, centres of Rabindra mukta vidyalaya, recognised Sanskrit tols, institutions for the blind and other handicapped persons, Anganwadi centres, reformatory schools etc.

The following institutions are located in Basirhat subdivision:
Basirhat College was established at Basirhat in 1947.
Kalinagar Mahavidyalaya was established at Kalinagar, in 1985.
Hingalganj Mahavidyalaya was established at Hingalganj in 2005.
Saheed Nurul Islam Mahavidyalaya was established at Tentulia in 2001.
Taki Government College was established at Taki in 1950.
Bamanpukur Humayun Kabir Mahavidyalaya was established at Bamanpukur in 1973,

Healthcare
The table below (all data in numbers) presents an overview of the medical facilities available and patients treated in the hospitals, health centres and sub-centres in 2013 in North 24 Parganas district.

.* Excluding nursing homes.** Subdivision-wise break up for certain items not available.

Medical facilities available in Basirhat subdivision are as follows:

Hospitals: (Name, location, beds)
Basirhat Subdivisional Hospital, Basirhat, 300 beds
Hasnabad Matri Sadan, Hasnabad, 6 beds

Rural Hospitals: (Name, block, location, beds)
Rudrapur (Baduria) Rural Hospital, Rudrapur, 60 beds
Minakhan Rural Hospital, Minakhan, 25 beds
Sarapole (Sonarpur) Rural Hospital, Sarapole, 30 beds
Taki Rural Hospital, Taki, 50 beds
Ghoshpur Rural Hospital, Ghoshpur, 30 beds
Sandeshkhali Rural Hospital, Sandeshkhali, 26 beds
Haroa (Adampur) Rural Hospital, Haroa, 30 beds
Sandelerbil Rural Hospital, Sandelerbil, 30 beds
Dhanyakuria Rural Hospital, Dhanyakuria, 30 beds

Block Primary Health Centres: (Name, block, location, beds)
Shibhati BPHC, Shibhati, 15 beds

Primary Health Centres: (CD Block-wise)(CD Block, PHC location, beds)
Baduria CD Block: Dakshin Chatra PHC (6), Jadurhati PHC (6), Masia PHC (6), Bajitpur PHC, Model Belghoria (10), 
Haroa CD Block:  Gopalpur PHC (10), Kamarghanti PHC, Sonapukur (6)
Minakhan CD Block: Nimichi PHC (6), Duturdaha (10)
Swarupnagar CD Block: Bankra PHC (10), Charghat PHC (10)
Hasnabad CD Block: Bhawanipur PHC, Bhurkundu (10), Ghola PHC, Bhebia (6), Barunhat PHC, Bara Bankra (10)
Hingalganj CD Block: Hingalganj PHC (6), Jogeshganj PHC (10)
Sandeshkhali I CD Block: Hatgachia PHC, Agarbati (10), Nazat PHC (6)
Sandeshkhali II CD Block: Korakanthi PHC (10), Jeliakhali PHC (6)
Basirhat I CD Block: Nakuda PHC (10) 
Basirhat II CD Block: Sikra Kulingram PHC (6), Rajendrapur PHC (10)

Electoral constituencies
Lok Sabha (parliamentary) and Vidhan Sabha (state assembly) constituencies in Basirhat subdivision were as follows:

See also 
 Basirhat district - proposed

References

Subdivisions in North 24 Parganas district
Basirhat